Interference – Book One: Shock Tactic is an original novel written by Lawrence Miles and based on the long-running British science fiction television series Doctor Who. It features the Eighth Doctor, the Third Doctor, Sam, Fitz, Sarah Jane, and K-9.

The book also marks Sam's departure, and the introduction of a new companion, Compassion.

See also

 Interference – Book Two
 Faction Paradox

External links
The Cloister Library - Interference: Book One

1999 British novels
1999 science fiction novels
Eighth Doctor Adventures
Third Doctor novels
Novels by Lawrence Miles
Doctor Who multi-Doctor stories
BBC Books books
Faction Paradox